A commando is a combatant, or operative of an elite light infantry or special operations force, specially trained for carrying out raids and operating in small teams behind enemy lines.

Originally "a commando" was a type of combat unit, as opposed to an individual in that unit. In other languages, commando and kommando denote a "command", including the sense of a military or an elite special operations unit. In the militaries and governments of most countries, commandos are distinctive in that they specialize in unconventional assault on high-value targets.

In English, to distinguish between an individual commando and a commando unit, the unit is occasionally capitalized.

Etymology 

From an ancient lingual perspective the term commando derives from Latin commendare, to recommend. From the perspective of the early modern era the word stems from the Dutch word kommando, which translates as "a command or order" and also roughly to "mobile infantry regiment". This term originally referred to units of Boer mounted infantry, who fought during the Xhosa Wars and the First and Second Boer Wars. It is also possible the word was adopted into Afrikaans from interactions with the Portuguese in their nearby African colonies, 
in whose language the word comando means "command".  Less likely, it is a High German loan word, which was borrowed from Italian in the 17th century, from the sizable minority of German settlers in the initial European colonization of South Africa.

The Oxford English Dictionary ties the English use of the word meaning  "[a] member of a body of picked men ..." directly into its Afrikaans' origins:
 During World War II, newspaper reports of the deeds of "the commandos" only in the plural led to readers thinking that the singular meant one man rather than one military unit, and this new usage became established.

Selection 
Due to the special mental and physiological requirements made of the applicants, there are restrictions entering "commando" units. Applicants have to fulfil special requirements. Selecting applicants with the highest motivation, modern special forces run special selection processes.

Historically there is evidence of selection for the Otdelnly Gwardieskij Batalion Minerow, predecessors of the modern Russian speznas. Soldiers had to be younger than 30 years, were mostly athletes or hunters and had to show the highest motivation. During training and selection some participants died since they were exhausted and left to their devices.

The German Kommando Spezialkräfte (KSK) demands from their applicants high levels of physical resilience, teamwork, willingness to learn, mental resilience, willpower, sense of responsibility, flexibility, secrecy and adaptation. These skills are proved during assessment.

The fitness test of the U.S. Navy SEALs tests swimming speed over 500 yards, number of push-ups and sit-ups within 2 minutes, pull-ups and running 1.5 miles.

Long Range Desert Group hired their personnel after a very long interrogation. First SAS members had to complete a march of 50km, and the Royal Marine commandos tested their applicants' motivation during an obstacle course using real explosives and machine gun fire close to Achnacary in Scotland. The French Foreign Legion assesses their applicants through medical, intelligence, logic, and fitness tests as well as interrogations, small drills and solving small tasks. 

Commando soldiers shall think independently. This is the opposite of military tradition but necessary to work in small and smallest groups, avoiding enemies' reconnaissance.

Boer name origin and adoption by Britain

 
After the Dutch Cape Colony was established in 1652, the word was used to describe bands of militia. The first "Commando Law" was instated by the original Dutch East India Company chartered settlements and similar laws were maintained through the independent Boer Orange Free State and South African Republic.  The law compelled burghers to equip themselves with horses and firearms when required in defense. The implementation of these laws was called the "Commando System".  A group of mounted militiamen was organized in a unit known as a commando and headed by a commandant, who was normally elected from inside the unit. Men called up to serve were said to be "on commando".  British experience with this system led to the widespread adoption of the word "commandeer" into English in the 1880s.

During the Great Trek, conflicts with Southern African peoples such as the Xhosa and the Zulu caused the Boers to retain the commando system despite being free of colonial laws.  Also, the word became used to describe any armed raid.  During this period, the Boers also developed guerrilla techniques for use against numerically superior but less mobile bands of natives such as the Zulu, who fought in large, complex formations.

In the First Boer War, Boer commandos were able to use superior marksmanship, fieldcraft, camouflage and mobility to expel the British (wearing red uniforms, poorly trained in marksmanship and unmounted) from the Transvaal.  These tactics were continued throughout the Second Boer War.  In the final phase of the war, 25,000 Boers carried out asymmetric warfare against the 450,000-strong British Imperial forces for two years after the British had captured the capitals of the two Boer republics. During these conflicts the word entered the English language, retaining its general Afrikaans meaning of a "militia unit" or a "raid". Robert Baden-Powell recognised the importance of fieldcraft and was inspired to form the scouting movement.

In 1941, Lieutenant-Colonel D. W. Clarke of the British Imperial General Staff, suggested the name commando for specialized raiding units of the British Army Special Service in evocation of the effectiveness and tactics of the Boer commandos. During World War II, American and British publications, confused over the use of the plural "commandos" for that type of British military units, gave rise to the modern common habit of using "a commando" to mean one member of such a unit, or one man engaged on a raiding-type operation.

Green Berets and training 
Since the 20th century and World War II in particular, commandos have been set apart from other military units by virtue of their extreme training regimes; these are usually associated with the awarding of green berets which originated with British Commandos. The British Commandos were instrumental in founding many other international commando units during World War II. Some international commando units were formed from members who served as part of or alongside British Commandos, such as the Dutch Korps Commandotroepen (who still wear the recognition flash insignia of the British Fairbairn–Sykes fighting knife), the Belgian 5th Special Air Service, or Greek Sacred Band. In 1944 the SAS Brigade was formed from the British 1st and 2nd SAS, the French 3rd and 4th SAS, and the Belgian 5th SAS. The French Army special forces (1er RPIMa) still use the motto Qui Ose Gagne, a translation of the SAS motto "Who Dares Wins".

In addition, many Commonwealth nations were part of the original British Commando units. They developed their own national traditions, including the Australian Special Air Service Regiment, the New Zealand Special Air Service, and the Rhodesian Special Air Service, all of whom share (or used to) the same insignia and motto as their British counterparts. During the Second World War, the British SAS quickly adopted sand-coloured berets, since they were almost entirely based in the North African theatre; they used these rather than green berets to distinguish themselves from other British Commando units. (See History of the Special Air Service). Other Commonwealth commando units were formed after the Second World War directly based on the British Commando units, such as the Australian Army Reserve 1st Commando Regiment (Australia), distinct from the Regular Army 2nd Commando Regiment (Australia), who originated from the 4th Battalion, Royal Australian Regiment in 1997 .

The US Rangers were founded by Major General Lucian Truscott of the US Army, a liaison officer with the British General Staff. In 1942, he submitted a proposal to General George Marshall that an American unit be set up "along the lines of the British Commandos". The original US Rangers trained at the British Commandos centre at Achnacarry Castle. The US Navy SEALs' original formation, the Observer Group, was also trained and influenced by British Commandos. The US Special Forces originated with the First Special Service Force, formed under British Combined Operations. The First Special Service Force was a joint American-Canadian unit and modern Canadian special operations forces also trace their lineage to this unit and through it to British Commandos, despite existing in their modern incarnation only since 2006.

Malaysian green beret special forces PASKAL and Grup Gerak Khas (who still wear the Blue Lanyard of the Royal Marines) were originally trained by British Commandos. The Brazilian marine special operations COMANF also originated with Royal Marines mentoring. Other British units, such as the SAS, led to the development of many international special operations units that are now typically referred to as commandos, including the Bangladeshi Para-Commando Brigade, Pakistani Special Services Group, the Indian MARCOS, Jordanian Special Operation Forces and Philippine National Police Special Action Force.

Commando or special forces operators typically are more emotional stable, conscientious, and closed minded than matched civilian controls and other types of soldiers.

World War I

Austro-Hungarian assault units

During the winter of 1914–1915 large parts of the Eastern Front switched to trench warfare. To cope with the new situation many Austro-Hungarian regiments spontaneously formed infantry squads called Jagdkommandos. These squads were named after the specially trained forces of Russian army formed in 1886 and were used to protect against ambushes, to perform reconnaissance and for low intensity fights in no-man's-land.

Austro-Hungarian High army command (Armeeoberkommando, AOK) realized the need for special forces and decided to draw on German experience. Starting in September–October 1916 about 120 officers and 300 NCOs were trained in the German training area in Beuville (near the village of Doncourt) to be the main cadre of the newly raised Austro-Hungarian army assault battalions. The former Jagdkommandos were incorporated into these battalions.

Italy 

The first country to establish commando troops was Italy, in the summer 1917, shortly before Germany.

Italy used specialist trench-raiding teams to break the stalemate of static fighting against Austria-Hungary, in the Alpine battles of World War I. These teams were called "Arditi" (meaning "daring, brave ones"); they were almost always men under 25 in top physical condition and, possibly at first, bachelors (due to fear of very high casualty rates). Actually the Arditi (who were led to the lines just a few hours before the assault, having been familiarised with the terrain via photo-reconnaissance and trained on trench systems re-created ad hoc for them) suffered fewer casualties than regular line infantry and were highly successful in their tasks. Many volunteered for extreme-right formations in the turbulent years after the war and (the Fascist Party took pride in this and adopted the style and the mannerism of Arditi), but some of left-wing political persuasions created the "Arditi del Popolo" (People's Arditi) and for some years held the fascist raids in check, defending Socialist and Communist Party sections, buildings, rallies and meeting places.

World War II

Australia 

The Australian Army formed commando units, known as Australian independent companies in the early stages of World War II. They first saw action in early 1942 during the Japanese assault on New Ireland, and in the Battle of Timor. Part of the 2/1st Independent Company was wiped out on New Ireland, but on Timor, the 2/2nd Independent Company formed the heart of an Allied force that engaged Japanese forces in a guerrilla campaign. The Japanese commander on the island drew parallels with the Boer War, and decided that it would require a 10:1 numerical advantage to defeat the Allies. The campaign occupied the attention of an entire Japanese division for almost a year. The independent companies were later renamed commando squadrons, and they saw widespread action in the South West Pacific Area, especially in New Guinea and Borneo. In 1943, all the commando squadrons except the 2/2nd and 2/8th were grouped into the 2/6th, 2/7th and 2/9th Cavalry Commando Regiments.

Later in the war the Royal Australian Navy also formed commando units along the lines of the Royal Naval Commandos to go ashore with the first waves of major amphibious assaults, to signpost the beaches and carry out other naval tasks. These were known as RAN Commandos. Four were formed—lettered A, B, C and D like their British counterparts—and they took part in the Borneo campaign.

Z Force, an Australian-British-New Zealand military intelligence commando unit, formed by the Australian Services Reconnaissance Department, also carried out many raiding and reconnaissance operations in the South West Pacific theatre, most notably Operation Jaywick, in which they destroyed tonnes of Japanese shipping at Singapore Harbour. An attempt to replicate this success, with Operation Rimau, resulted in the death of almost all those involved. However, Z Force and other SRD units continued operations until the war's end.

Canada 
A joint Canadian-American Commando unit, the 1st Special Service Force, nicknamed the Devil's Brigade, was formed in 1942 under the command of Colonel Robert Frederick. The unit initially saw service in the Pacific, in August 1943 at Kiska in the Aleutians campaign. However most of its operations occurred during the Italian campaign and in southern France. Its most famous raid, which was documented in the film Devil's Brigade, was the battle of Monte la Difensa. In 1945, the unit was disbanded; some of the Canadian members were sent to the 1st Canadian Parachute Battalion as replacements, and the American members were sent to either the 101st Airborne Division or the 82nd Airborne Division as replacements or the 474th Regimental Combat Team. Ironically they were sent to serve in Norway in 1945, the country they were formed to raid.

Finland
The Finns fielded the Erillinen Pataljoona 4 and about 150 men were trained before the beginning of summer 1941. At first, the units had as few as 15 men, but during the war this was increased to 60. On July 1, 1943, the units were organised in the 4th Detached Battalion. In 1944, a special unit with amphibious He 115 planes was founded to support the battalion. The total strength of the battalion was 678 men and 76 women (see Lotta Svärd).

In the Battle of Ilomantsi, soldiers of the 4th disrupted the supply lines of the Soviet artillery, preventing effective fire support. The battalion made over 50 missions in 1943 and just under 100 in 1944, and was disbanded on November 30 of that same year.

Sissiosasto/5.D is another Finnish Commando unit of the World War Two era. The Detachment was founded on August 20, 1941, under the Lynx Division (5th Division, Finnish VI Corps). It was a self-contained unit for reconnaissance patrolling, sabotage and guerrilla warfare operations behind enemy lines.

Germany 

In December 1939, following the success of German infiltration and sabotage operations in the Polish campaign, the German Office for Foreign and Counter-Intelligence (OKW Amt Ausland/Abwehr) formed the Brandenburger Regiment (known officially as the 800th Special Purpose Training and Construction Company). The Brandenburgers conducted a mixture of covert and conventional operations but became increasingly involved in ordinary infantry actions and were eventually converted into a Panzer-Grenadier Division, suffering heavy losses in Russia. Otto Skorzeny (most famed for his rescue of Benito Mussolini) conducted many special operations for Adolf Hitler. Skorzeny commanded Sonderlehrgang z.b.V. Oranienburg, Sonderverband z.b.V. Friedenthal, and SS-Jäger-Bataillon 502, 500th SS Parachute Battalion, SS-Jagdverband Mitte and all other SS commando units.

The German Fallschirmjäger were famous for their elite skills and their use in rapid commando style raids and as elite "fire brigade" infantrymen. Fort Eben-Emael on the Belgian border was captured in 1940 by Fallschirmjäger troops as part of the German invasion and occupation of Belgium.

A report written by Major-General Robert Laycock in 1947 claimed that there was a German raid on a radar station on the Isle of Wight in 1941.

Greece 

The Sacred band was a Greek special forces unit formed in 1942 in the Middle East, composed entirely of Greek officers and officer cadets under the command of Col. Christodoulos Tsigantes. It fought alongside the SAS in the Libyan Desert and with the SBS in the Aegean, as well as with General Leclerc's Free French Forces in Tunisia. It was disbanded in August 1945.

Italy 
Italy's most renowned commando unit of World War II was Decima Flottiglia MAS ("10th Assault Vehicle Flotilla"), which, from mid-1940, sank or damaged a considerable tonnage of Allied ships in the Mediterranean.

After Italy surrendered in 1943, some of the Decima Flottiglia MAS were on the Allied side of the battle line and fought with the Allies, renaming themselves the Mariassalto. The others fought on the German side and kept their original name but did not operate at sea after 1943, being mostly employed against Italian partisans; some of its men were involved in atrocities against civilians.

In post-war years the Italian marine commandos were re-organised as the "Comsubin" (an abbreviation of Comando Subacqueo Incursori, or Underwater Raiders Command).  They wear the green Commando beret.

Japan 
In 1944–45, Japanese Teishin Shudan ("Raiding Group") and Giretsu ("heroic") detachments made airborne assaults on Allied airfields in the Philippines, Marianas and Okinawa. The attacking forces varied in size from a few paratroopers to operations involving several companies. Due to the balance of forces concerned, these raids achieved little in the way of damage or casualties, and resulted in the destruction of the Japanese units concerned. Considering that there were no plans to extract these forces, and the reluctance to surrender by Japanese personnel during that era, they are often seen in the same light as kamikaze pilots of 1944–45.

Nakano School trained intelligence and commando officers and organized commando teams for sabotage and guerrilla warfare.

The navy had commando units "S-toku" (Submarine special attack units, see Kure 101st JSNLF(in Japanese) ) for infiltrating enemy areas by submarine. It was called the Japanese Special Naval Landing Forces of Kure 101st, Sasebo 101st and 102nd.

New Zealand 
New Zealand formed the Southern Independent Commando in Fiji 1942.

Poland 

Cichociemni (the "Silent Unseen") were elite special-operations paratroopers of the Polish Army in exile, created in Great Britain during World War II to operate in occupied Poland (Cichociemni Spadochroniarze Armii Krajowej).

Soviet Union 
Voyennaya Razvyedka (Razvedchiki Scouts) are "Military intelligence" personnel/units within larger formations in ground troops, airborne troops and marines. Intelligence battalion in the division, reconnaissance company in the brigade, a reconnaissance platoon in the regiment.

Soviet Naval Frogmen
The legendary Soviet Naval Scout Viktor Leonov commanded an elite unit of Naval Commandos. The 4th Special Volunteer Detachment was a unit of 70 veterans. Initially they were confined to performing small scale reconnaissance missions, platoon sized insertions by sea and on occasion on land into Finland and later Norway. Later they were renamed the 181st Special Reconnaissance Detachment. They began conducting sabotage missions and raids to snatch prisoners for interrogation. They would also destroy German ammunition and supply depots, communication centers, and harass enemy troop concentrations along the Finnish and Russian coasts. After the European conflict ended, Leonov and his men were sent to the Pacific theatre to conduct operations against the Japanese.

United Kingdom 

In 1940, the British Army formed "independent companies", later reformed as battalion sized "commandos", thereby reviving the word. The British intended that their commandos be small, highly mobile surprise raiding and military reconnaissance forces. They intended them to carry all they needed and not remain in field operations for more than 36 hours. Army Commandos were all volunteers selected from existing soldiers still in Britain.

During the war the British Army Commandos spawned several other famous British units such as the Special Air Service, the Special Boat Service and the Parachute Regiment. The British Army Commandos themselves were never regimented and were disbanded at the end of the war.

The Special Operations Executive (SOE) also formed commando units from British and displaced European personnel (e.g., Cichociemni) to conduct raiding operations in occupied Europe. They also worked in small teams, such as the SAS, which was composed of ten or fewer commandos because that was better for special operations. One example is Norwegian Independent Company 1, which destroyed heavy water facilities in Norway in 1941.

The Royal Navy also controlled Royal Navy Beach Parties, based on teams formed to control the evacuation of Dunkirk in 1940. These were later known simply as RN Commandos, and they did not see action until they successfully fought for control of the landing beaches (as in the disastrous Dieppe Raid of 19 August 1942). The RN Commandos, including Commando "W" from the Royal Canadian Navy, saw action on D-Day.

In 1942, the Royal Navy's nine Royal Marines infantry battalions were reorganized as Commandos, numbered from 40 to 48, joining the British Army Commandos in combined Commando Brigades. After the war the Army Commandos were disbanded. The Royal Marines form an enduring Brigade-strength capability as 3 Commando Brigade with supporting Army units.

The Royal Air Force also formed 15 commando units in 1942, each of which was 150 strong. These units consisted of trained technicians, armourers and maintainers who had volunteered to undertake the commando course. These Royal Air Force Commandos accompanied the Allied invasion forces in all theatres; their main role was to allow the forward operation of friendly fighters by servicing and arming them from captured air fields. However, due to the forward position of these airfields, the RAF Commandos were also trained to secure and make safe these airfields and to help defend them from enemy counterattack.

United States 

During 1941, the United States Marine Corps formed commando battalions.  The USMC commandos were known collectively as Marine Raiders. On orders from President Franklin D. Roosevelt through a proposal from OSS Director Colonel William J. Donovan and the former Commander of the United States Marine Detachment Major Evans F Carlson, directed the formation of what became the Marine Raiders. Initially this unit was to be called Marine Commandos and were to be the counterpart to the British Commandos. The name Marine Commandos met with much controversy within the Marine Corps leading Commandant Thomas J. Holcomb to state, "the term 'Marine' is sufficient to indicate a man ready for duty at any time, and the injection of a special name, such as commando, would be undesirable and superfluous." President Roosevelt's son James Roosevelt served with the Marine Raiders. The Raiders initially saw action at the Battle of Tulagi and the Battle of Makin, as well as the Battle of Guadalcanal, the Battle of Empress Augusta Bay, and other parts of the Pacific Ocean Areas. In February 1944 the four Raider battalions were converted to regular Marine units. Additionally, as parachuting special forces units, Paramarines arguably also qualified as commandos- though they too were assimilated into regular Marine units in 1944.

In mid-1942, the United States Army formed its Army Rangers in Northern Ireland under William O. (Bill) Darby. The Rangers were designed along the similar lines to the British Commandos. The first sizable Ranger action took place in August 1942 at the Dieppe Raid, where 50 Rangers from the 1st Ranger Battalion were dispersed among Canadian regulars and British Commandos. The first full Ranger action took place in November 1942 during the invasion of Algiers in Northwest Africa in Operation Torch, again by members of the 1st Ranger Battalion.

After 1945

Israeli 

 Operation Entebbe which took place in 1976 at the airport of Entebbe in Entebbe near Kampala Uganda. During the operation Israeli units liberated the passengers of an Air France flight 139 captured by German and Palestinian terrorists 
 Operation Rooster captured a Soviet radar station in 1969. Four Egyptian technicians were taken as prisoners to Israel.
 Operation Spring of Youth killed Muhammad Youssef al-Najjar and Kamal Adwan in 1973 in Beirut.

US 

 Operation Neptune Spear killed Osama bin Laden in 2011
 Operation Irene, failure in capturing wanted criminals involved with the Somali Civil War in 1993

Terror (non-government) 

 1972: Kommando 2. Juni – RAF bombing against Springer building in Hamburg
 1977: Kommando Martyr Halimeh – Airplane to Mallorca captured to press free imprisoned members of Rote Armee Fraktion(RAF) and PLO
 1986: Kommando Mara Cagol – RAF bombing of Siemens-Manager Karl Heinz Beckurt
 2002: Commando of columbian FARC kidnapped Archbishop Jorge Enrique Jiménez Carvajal

See also 

 French Foreign Legion
 Special Forces Command (Turkey)
 Gurkha
 Going commando
 Kommando
 Yank Levy
 List of commando units
 Long-range reconnaissance patrol
 Recondo School
 United States Army Reconnaissance and Surveillance Leaders Course

References 

Combat occupations
 
Boer Wars